Aurora is a city in Buchanan County, Iowa, United States. The population was 169 in the 2020 census, a decline from 194 in 2000.

Aurora was founded in 1886 by the Chicago Great Western Railway, and incorporated in 1899. The town was laid out on land donated by a Bishop Warren and his wife Alice, and is named after Warren's birthplace of East Aurora, New York.

Geography
Aurora's longitude and latitude coordinates in decimal form are 42.618061, -91.728519.

Demographics

2010 census
As of the census of 2010, there were 185 people, 79 households, and 58 families residing in the city. The racial makeup of the city was 95.1% White, 0.5% African American, and 4.3% from two or more races. Hispanic or Latino of any race were 1.6% of the population.

There were 79 households, of which 30.4% had children under the age of 18 living with them, 55.7% were married couples living together, 11.4% had a female householder with no husband present, 6.3% had a male householder with no wife present, and 26.6% were non-families. 24.1% of all households were made up of individuals, and 8.8% had someone living alone who was 65 years of age or older. The average household size was 2.34 and the average family size was 2.69.

The median age in the city was 43.7 years. 22.2% of residents were under the age of 18; 7% were between the ages of 18 and 24; 22.1% were from 25 to 44; 31.2% were from 45 to 64; and 17.3% were 65 years of age or older. The gender makeup of the city was 54.1% male and 45.9% female.

2000 census
As of the census of 2000, there were 194 people, 78 households, and 52 families residing in the city. The racial makeup of the city was 94.85% White, 0.52% Native American, and 4.64% from two or more races.

There were 78 households, out of which 33.3% had children under the age of 18 living with them, 55.1% were married couples living together, 11.5% had a female householder with no husband present, and 32.1% were non-families. 29.5% of all households were made up of individuals, and 16.7% had someone living alone who was 65 years of age or older. The average household size was 2.49 and the average family size was 3.09.

In the city, the population was spread out, with 28.4% under the age of 18, 7.2% from 18 to 24, 26.3% from 25 to 44, 21.6% from 45 to 64, and 16.5% who were 65 years of age or older. The median age was 37 years. For every 100 females, there were 94.0 males. For every 100 females age 18 and over, there were 104.4 males.

The median income for a household in the city was $38,750, and the median income for a family was $42,188. Males had a median income of $25,000 versus $22,500 for females. The per capita income for the city was $16,254. About 15.8% of families and 19.5% of the population were below the poverty line, including 28.8% of those under the age of eighteen and 13.3% of those 65 or over.

Education
Aurora is served by the East Buchanan Community School District.

References

External links
Aurora City Website
East Buchanan Community School District

 

Cities in Buchanan County, Iowa
Cities in Iowa
1886 establishments in Iowa